Rupert Wegerif (born 2 September 1959) is a professor of education at the University of Cambridge in England.

Overview
Prof. Wegerif is a writer and researcher in the field of dialogic education and dialogic education with technology. He has proposed a dialogic theory of education for the Internet Age, and conducted research on education technology as a support for teaching dialogue in classrooms as well as designing for dialogue with the Internet. He was the founder of the Elsevier journal Thinking Skills and Creativity and lead editor until 2017. He is founder and director of the Digital Education Futures Initiative (DEFI) at Hughes Hall, Cambridge.

Education
Wegerif studied Philosophy with Social Anthropology at the University of Kent (1980–83), began a PhD on Derrida and Millenarianism at the University of Kent in 1984 which he did not complete, did a Post-Graduate Certificate of Education (PGCE) specialising in Religious Education at Bristol from 1990 to 1991 and a Masters in Information Technology at Queen Mary and Westfield College, London University, 1991 to 1992 followed by a PhD in Education Technology at the UK Open University, 1992 to 1996. His topic was ‘Using computers to teach reasoning through talking across the curriculum’.

Career 
Wegerif began his academic career at the Open University working with Neil Mercer on a range of funded projects to explore the impact of teaching ‘Exploratory Talk’ on learning, especially on learning with computers. In 2004, he went to the University of Southampton as a Reader and in 2006 he joined the University of Exeter as a professor. In 2017, Wegerif became the Professor of Education (2000) at the Faculty of Education, University of Cambridge. There he co-leads the Cambridge Educational Dialogue Research Group (CEDiR). In November 2017, Wegerif was awarded a Fellowship at Hughes Hall College (Cambridge).

He is known for developing a dialogic theory of Education. This argues for the importance of dialogue as an aim of education as well as being a means to education. Wegerif understands learning as being motivated by relationships and taking the form of 'dialogic switches' whereby students take on different perspectives within already existing dialogues. The originality of the theory lies in the focus on the significance for development of the 'dialogic gap' between perspectives. This leads to a model of development that is not primarily characterised in terms of individual identities or expanding knowledge but in terms of expanding 'dialogic space'. Education is understood as opening, widening and deepening dialogic space through dialogue with specific others, cultural ‘general others’ personifying communities of practice and also ‘the Infinite Other’. The ‘Infinite Other’ is the idea that the unbounded horizon of knowledge can act as a voice within educational dialogues.

Wegerif has gained significant sums in research funding for projects exploring diversity in science education and developing tools to support Learning to Learn Together (L2L2) online. In 2006, he founded the journal Thinking Skills and Creativity with Anna Craft. They edited the journal together until Anna Craft's death in 2014. Wegerif remained chief editor of the journal through June 2018, and was subsequently replaced by Teresa Cremin and Pamela Burnard.

Books
Wegerif's books include:

Kershner, R., Hennessy, S., Wegerif, R., & Ahmed, A. (2020). Research Methods for Educational Dialogue. Bloomsbury Publishing.
Mercer, N., Wegerif, R., & Major, L. (2019). The Routledge International Handbook of Research on Dialogic Education. Routledge.
Kerslake, L. and Wegerif, R. (Eds.) (2018) The Theory of Teaching Thinking. International Perspectives. Routledge
Phillipson, N and Wegerif, R (2017). Dialogic Education: Mastering core concepts through thinking together. London and New York, Routledge.
Wegerif, R, Li, L. and Kaufman, J.C. (Eds.)(2015) The Routledge International Handbook of Research on Teaching Thinking, Routledge.
Wegerif, R (2013) Dialogic: Education for the Internet Age. London: Routledge 
Mansour, N and Wegerif, R. (Eds.)(2013) Science Education for Diversity. New Jersey: Springer 
Wegerif, R (2010) Mind-Expanding: Teaching for Thinking and Creativity. Buckingham, UK: Open University Press/mcgraw Hill
Wegerif. R. (2007) Dialogic, Education and Technology: Expanding the Space of Learning. New York: Springer-Verlag.
Williams, S and Wegerif, R. (2005) Radical Encouragement: Changing cultures of thinking. Birmingham: Imaginative Minds. 
Wegerif, R. and Dawes, L. (2004) Thinking and learning with ICT: raising achievement in primary classrooms. London: Routledge. 
Dawes, L., Mercer, N. And Wegerif, R. (2004 2nd Edition) Thinking Together: A programme of activities for developing speaking, listening and thinking skills for children aged 8–11. Birmingham: Imaginative Minds Ltd. 
Wegerif, R. and Scrimshaw, P. (Eds.) (1997) Computers and Talk in the Primary Classroom. Clevedon: Multilingual Matters.

References

External links
 Rupert Wegerif website
 Rupert Wegerif homepage at the University of Cambridge
 Rupert Wegerif page at Hughes Hall, University of Cambridge

1959 births
Living people
Alumni of the University of Kent
Alumni of the Open University
Alumni of the University of Bristol
Alumni of Queen Mary University of London
Academics of the University of Southampton
Academics of the University of Exeter
English educational theorists
Academic journal editors